Woman's Love—Woman's Suffering (German: Frauenliebe - Frauenleid) is a 1937 German drama film directed by Augusto Genina and starring Magda Schneider, Iván Petrovich and Oskar Sima.

Cast

References

Bibliography 
 Hake, Sabine. Popular Cinema of the Third Reich. University of Texas Press, 2001.

External links 
 

1937 films
1937 drama films
German drama films
Films of Nazi Germany
1930s German-language films
Films directed by Augusto Genina
Cine-Allianz films
German black-and-white films
1930s German films